Roger Abrantes (born 1951 in Portugal) is a Portuguese author on the behaviors of animals, with a PhD in evolutionary biology and ethology, and a Bachelor of Arts in philosophy. He is the divisional director at the Ethology Institute Cambridge where he holds regular lectures.

Publications
Dog Language: An Encyclopedia of Canine Behavior (1997) 
Dogs Home Alone (1999) 
The Evolution of Canine Social Behavior (2003) 
Dog Behavior A-Z (2005)

References

External links
Roger Abrantes at WordPress
Ethology Institute Cambridge

1951 births
Portuguese male writers
Living people